Edise may refer to:
Edişə, Jalilabad, village and municipality in the Jalilabad Rayon of Azerbaijan
Edise, Estonia, village in Jõhvi Parish, Ida-Viru County, Estonia